Hon'inbō Shūhaku (本因坊秀伯, 1716–1741) was a Japanese professional go player, and seventh head of Hon'inbō house. His succession to his short-lived predecessor, in 1733, was irregular, since he had not been officially adopted as heir. He too was destined to die young, and his time was marked by intrigues.

The major match in which he was involved was against Inoue Shunseki.

Sources
GoGod Encyclopedia

1716 births
1741 deaths
Japanese Go players
18th-century Go players